KIQN may refer to:

 KIQN (FM), a radio station (103.3 FM) licensed to serve Colorado City, Colorado, United States
 KEIM-LP, a defunct low-power radio station (103.1 FM) formerly licensed to serve Monument, Colorado, which held the call sign KIQN-LP from 2014 to 2015
 KLCX, a radio station (106.9 FM) licensed to serve Pueblo, Colorado, which held the call sign KIQN from 2009 to 2014